The Nasrid dynasty, also referred to as the Later Saffarids of Seistan or the Maliks of Nimruz, was an Iranian Sunni dynasty that ruled Sistan in the power vacuum left by the collapse of the Ghaznavid Empire and until the Mongol invasion of Central Asia. The Nasrids were a branch of the Saffarid dynasty, and the establishment of the Nasrid Kingdom at Nimruz in 1068 until its dissolution in 1225 represents a transient resurgence of Saffarid rule in Sistan.

The kingdom was established by Tadj al-Din I Abu l-Fadl Nasr who was the Malik of Sistan under the Ghaznavids. Nasrid maliks ruled intermittently as sovereigns or vassals of larger neighboring powers, including the Seljuks, the Ghurids, and the Khwarezmians. After the dissolution of the kingdom by Inaltigin Khwarazmi in the wake of the Mongol invasion, the region was ruled by a third dynasty of Saffarids, the Mihrabanids.

Nasrid maliks

See also

Saffarids
Mihrabanids
Iranian Intermezzo
History of Afghanistan
List of Sunni Muslim dynasties

References

Saffarid dynasty
History of Nimruz Province
Emirs of Sistan